MacLarens Landing is a community in West Carleton-March Ward in Ottawa, Ontario.

The area's name is derived from James Maclaren, who opened a mill in nearby Buckingham, Quebec.

Ontario MPP Jack MacLaren is a descendant and resides in the area.

References

Neighbourhoods in Ottawa